Ludwik Paszkiewicz DFC (21 October 1907 – 27 September 1940) was a Polish fighter ace of the Polish Air Force in World War II with 6 confirmed kills.

Biography
Ludwik Paszkiewicz was born in 1907, the son of Ludwik and Janina. He studied at the Warsaw University of Technology then at the Lviv Polytechnic. In 1931 after his graduation he began military service. After completing Cadet Reserve course in Mołodeczno, Paszkiewicz entered the Polish Air Force Academy. On 4 August 1934 he was promoted to second lieutenant (podporucznik). Then he was assigned to the Polish 112th Fighter Escadrille. In 1937, he was promoted to the rank of lieutenant (porucznik). The same year, he married Maria Piwnicka, and one year later their daughter was born.

In 1939, he became commander of his unit. In August, he went to France with a military mission in order to buy aircraft, where the outbreak of the World War II found him. On 18 May 1940, Paszkiewicz became commander of the new formed section of the Groupe de Chasse II/8. In the Battle of Britain, the section made 33 flights, but never met the enemy.

On 21 June 1940, Paskiewicz arrived in the UK. On 2 August, he was posted to No. 303 Polish Fighter Squadron. On 30 August, during a training flight, he disobeyed orders and shot down a Messerschmitt Bf 110 fighter. He was officially reprimanded and unofficially congratulated by his superior officer. After S/L Kellet's personal recommendation, the squadron was declared operational next day by No. 11 Group RAF. His victory was portrayed in the movie Battle of Britain.

On 6 September, he became the commander of Flight B, when Wacław Łapkowski, the previous commander was wounded. The next day, Paszkiewicz downed two Dornier Do 17 light bombers. On 11 September, he shot down another Bf 110 and on 15 September he became an ace shooting down a Bf 109 fighter.

On 26 September, during the visit of King George VI, No. 303 Squadron was scrambled towards a large enemy raid over Hampshire, Paszkiewicz claimed a Heinkel He 111 bomber.

On 27 September, Paszkiewicz was hit by a Bf 109 and died in a crash-landing in Borough Green.

His only daughter died of diphtheria in 1941. His widow took part in the Warsaw Uprising. In 1960, she entered the convent of the Immaculate Conception in Szymanów, where she was named Augustyna. She died in 1995.

Aerial victory credits
 Bf 110 – 30 August 1940 (during a training flight; Bf 110 flown by Oberfw. Georg Anthony, gunner Uffz. Heinrich Nordmeyer jumped with a parachute)
 2 Do 17 – 7 September 1940
 Bf 110 - 11 September 1940
 Bf 109 - 15 September 1940
 He 111 – 26 September 1940

Awards
 Virtuti Militari, Silver Cross 
 Cross of Valour (Poland), two times
 Distinguished Flying Cross (United Kingdom)

References

Further reading
 
 Tadeusz Jerzy Krzystek, Anna Krzystek: Polskie Siły Powietrzne w Wielkiej Brytanii w latach 1940-1947 łącznie z Pomocniczą Lotniczą Służbą Kobiet (PLSK-WAAF). Sandomierz: Stratus, 2012, s. 438. 
 
 
 Jerzy Pawlak: Absolwenci Szkoły Orląt: 1925-1939. Warszawa: Retro-Art, 2009, s. 144-145. 
 Piotr Sikora: Asy polskiego lotnictwa. Warszawa: Oficyna Wydawnicza Alma-Press. 2014, s. 313-316. 
 Józef Zieliński: Asy polskiego lotnictwa. Warszawa: Agencja lotnicza ALTAIR, 1994, s. 51. ISBN 83862172. 
 Józef Zieliński: Lotnicy polscy w Bitwie o Wielką Brytanię. Warszawa: Oficyna Wydawnicza MH, 2005, s. 161-162. 

1940 deaths
1907 births
The Few
Polish World War II flying aces
Polish military personnel killed in World War II
Polish Royal Air Force pilots of World War II
Recipients of the Silver Cross of the Virtuti Militari
Recipients of the Cross of Valour (Poland)